Katipunan Avenue is a major avenue in Quezon City, Metro Manila, Philippines. It runs in a north–south direction from the University of the Philippines Diliman, intersecting with Tandang Sora Avenue at its northernmost point, down to the Manila Philippines Temple of the Church of Jesus Christ of Latter-day Saints, intersecting with White Plains Avenue at its southernmost point.

The road is a component of National Route 11 (N11) and National Route 129 (N129) of the Philippine highway network, respectively, and Circumferential Road 5 (C-5) of Manila's arterial road network.

The avenue has three lanes per direction in most sections, widening to four in select areas, and narrowing to two lanes within Barangays White Plains and Saint Ignatius.

An extension project, shelved by the government for the last six decades due to failed negotiations with private entities, has been revived by the Department of Public Works and Highways to address worsening traffic situations along Katipunan and Commonwealth Avenue, as well as Batasan–San Mateo Road. , the project is 70% complete.

Etymology
The avenue is named after the Katipunan revolution as the area now occupied by the road was originally carved as a passageway for Katipunan revolutionaries to make their way to Banlat, Balintawak, and Pugad Lawin during the Philippine Revolution against the Spanish colonial government in 1898.

Buildings
Along the avenue are several higher educational facilities, including the Ateneo de Manila University, Miriam College, and University of the Philippines Diliman. It is also the location of the Manila Water facilities within the Balara Filters Park. The area along Katipunan Avenue was originally intended as a low-density residential zone. Due to the populous universities along the avenue, numerous condominiums have been since been established in the area. In 2009, the SM Investments Group proposed to build a 31-story high-rise residential project called Stanford Residences on a  site on Katipunan Avenue near the Santa Maria della Strada Parish Church, totalling over 1,316 residential and commercial units. Local residents opposed the exemption. SM already had another high-rise project in progress on the other side of Katipunan Avenue, called Berkeley Residences, which was already 40% done by September 2009. SM indicated that it would be willing to move the Stanford Residences project to another location.

Despite advisories warning against alcohol beverage distribution near schools located along Katipunan Avenue, bar establishments continue to be a popular aspect of the area's nightlife. Popular bar establishments include Walrus, VSpot, and Lan Kwai.

Transport
The avenue generally features heavy motorized vehicle traffic, and is divided in the middle by traffic islands for the convenience of pedestrians. In 2005, the MMDA listed the area of Katipunan Avenue near Ateneo de Manila University as one of Metro Manila's 14 most dangerous traffic black spots. In 2008, the MMDA introduced a traffic rerouting plan on the avenue, cutting off some u-turn slots along the avenue; local residents complained, but the MMDA responded that the road was used by many motorists and not just local residents, and that the measures had improved traffic flow. Later the MMDA stated they might re-open some of the u-turn slots. In 2010, the Metropolitan Manila Development Authority (MMDA) announced that it would deploy 2,000 traffic enforcers along the avenue to deal with the heavy vehicular traffic. The city government built a pedestrian overpass in 2006 near Ateneo de Manila University.

Motorized tricycles have long been officially banned from Katipunan Avenue, but the ban was not always evenly enforced, until an announcement in August 2008 by the MMDA. MMDA stated that they would enforce the ban from Aurora Boulevard northwards. In September 2008, Quezon City councilor Allan Butch Francisco proposed an exception to the ban. He stated that the Quezon City Tricycle Ordinance of 1992 permitted tricycles to travel along national highways if those highways were the only access roads in the area, and that Katipunan Avenue was the only road linking to the u-turn slot on C.P. Garcia Avenue. Katipunan tricycle drivers held a strike in mid-September in protest.

Katipunan Station is located on Aurora Boulevard near its intersection with Katipunan Avenue. It is the only underground station on Line 2 and the whole LRTA system.

Landscape
In 2002, the Katipunan Greening Project volunteers planted Bougainvillea, Lantana camara, petunias, red creepers, and other flowering shrubs along the avenue, after two years of lobbying the MMDA to ensure that the city would water and otherwise look after the plants. Businesses along the avenue also lent a hand. In 2003, the MMDA proposed removing the trees and the traffic islands along the avenue, in an effort to improve the traffic flow; however, local residents objected. The tree-cutting was halted by an order from Malacañang, pending the return of then-President of the Philippines Gloria Macapagal Arroyo from an overseas trip. Again in 2009, the MMDA was cutting down trees along the avenue for a road-widening project; in the second case, the Department of Environment and Natural Resources ordered MMDA to stop, after protests by Ateneo de Manila University. There were further back-and-forth accusations between the two departments, with MMDA stating that the tree removal had already been agreed to with Department of Environment and Natural Resources (DENR), while DENR criticized MMDA's sloppy work in removing the trees.

Incidents

Crime
In 1996, Colonel Rolando Abadilla of the Philippine Constabulary (now Philippine National Police) Metropolitan Command Intelligence and Security Group was killed by four gunmen, including a fellow police officer, while driving along Katipunan Avenue in broad daylight. In 2002, a police officer was stabbed by the boyfriend of a girl whom he and his cousin had admitted harassing in a nightclub earlier that evening. An armed robber stole valuables from all the patrons of a restaurant there in September 2006. In June 2007, police and carjackers suspected to be planning a bank robbery had a pre-dawn gunbattle along the avenue, leaving three of the alleged criminals dead. In August 2007, three jeepney touts who worked along the avenue were arrested by police; their bodies were later dumped along the avenue, showing signs of torture. The incident led to a probe by the Philippines' Commission on Human Rights.

Traffic accidents
In November 2007, a truck hit a motorcycle while travelling south, precipitating a chain of collisions which ended with the truck slamming into a coffee shop. Five people were injured, and six or seven vehicles damaged. In 2008 there was a fatal accident along the avenue caused by a man driving under the influence of alcohol. The car in question had vehicle registration plates marking it as belonging to the National Prosecutor's League. Two teenagers from the Balara area were killed.

Intersections

Notes

References

Streets in Quezon City